The National Baptist Convention of America International, Inc., (NBCA Intl or NBCA) more commonly known as the National Baptist Convention of America or sometimes the Boyd Convention, is a Christian denomination based in the United States. It is a predominantly African-American Baptist denomination, and is headquartered in Louisville, Kentucky. The National Baptist Convention of America has members in the United States, Canada, the Caribbean, and Africa. The current president of the National Baptist Convention of America is Dr. Samuel C. Tolbert Jr. of Lake Charles, Louisiana.

History
In 1915, leaders and pastors of the National Baptist Convention, USA, Inc. disputed the ownership and operation of the independently-owned National Baptist Publishing Board in Nashville, Tennessee. The National Baptist Publishing Board was founded and led by Rev. R. H. Boyd out of concern with publishing companies established and led by white Baptists. He did not have financial support from the NBC USA and financed it himself using real estate in Texas and assistance from the Southern Baptist Convention.

The National Baptist Publishing Board fulfilled Boyd's goal of providing black Baptists with religious materials written by other black Baptists, primarily periodicals and Sunday School materials, but also including some books. At its beginning, the National Baptist Publishing Board took over responsibility for publishing the National Baptist Magazine and it launched the new Teacher's Monthly in 1897. The company started making a profit as early as the first quarter of 1897, when it distributed more than 180,000 copies of published materials. The National Baptist Publishing Board became the principal source of religious publications for black Baptists worldwide.

By 1906, it grew to become the largest African American publishing company in the United States. It is credited with being the first publisher of the old songs of Negro slaves, and it produced more than 25 songbooks and hymnals by 1921, including Golden Gems: A Song Book for the Church Choir, the Pew, and Sunday School (1901) and The National Baptist Hymnal (1903). Its publications are considered to have played a key role in establishing an African American Baptist religious and racial identity in the United States.

The dispute between Boyd and the NBC USA began due to the National Baptist Publishing Board's success. Pastors and other leaders within the convention were suspicious of the company and sought greater control, while Boyd asserted that the National Baptist Publishing Board was independent. The publishing company was incorporated as an independent entity in 1898. Boyd, who served as the National Baptist Convention secretary of missions from 1896 to 1914 while also leading the National Baptist Publishing Board, claimed that the company regularly contributed some of its profits to the missionary work of the NBC USA, but this was disputed.Following confrontations at the annual meeting of the National Baptist Convention in Chicago in 1915, Boyd and his supporters formed the National Baptist Convention of America, which became known informally as "National Baptist Convention, Unincorporated," and was sometimes derisively called the "Boyd National Convention." The leaders remaining in the original convention incorporated in 1916, adopting the name "National Baptist Convention, USA, Inc." The National Baptist Convention, USA, Inc. sued unsuccessfully to obtain ownership of the National Baptist Publishing Board and subsequently created its own Sunday School publishing board. In 1988, another controversy surrounding the publishing board (now the R.H. Boyd Publishing Corporation) led to the formation of the National Missionary Baptist Convention of America in 1988.

From 1986 to 2003, the convention was led Rev. E. Edward Jones, a civil rights icon who was the pastor for fifty-seven years of the Galilee Baptist Church in Shreveport, Louisiana.

In 2000, the National Baptist Convention of America grew to about 3.5 million members in more than 8,000 churches. It became the third-largest predominantly African American Christian body in the United States after the National Baptist Convention, USA, Inc. and the Church of God in Christ; by 2020, its membership declined to approximately 3,106,000 members in 12,336 churches.

The NBCA's headquarters were formerly located in Dallas, Texas. In 2017 the convention moved its headquarters to Louisville, Kentucky on the campus of Simmons College of Kentucky during the tenure of Dr. Samuel C. Tolbert Jr.; by 2018 under his leadership, the convention affiliated with the Baptist Seminary of Kentucky (primarily affiliated with the theologically moderate to progressive Cooperative Baptist Fellowship). It also hosted a conference with the theologically liberal Progressive National Baptist Convention in 2018 alongside the Cooperative Baptists.

Doctrine
The National Baptist Convention of America, in contrast to the National Baptist Convention, USA, Inc., and the Progressive National Baptist Convention among other primarily African American Christian denominations, has been closely aligned theologically with the conservative teaching of the Southern Baptist Convention, though membership have also expressed moderate theological principles, some even progressive. Some members of this convention have also dually affiliated with the Southern Baptists and Cooperative Baptists; and the National Baptist Convention of America promotes partnership with the Cooperative Baptists "to engage in multi- racial experiences of worship, fellowship, disaster relief, educational advancement and healthy dialogue that brings about oneness in the body of Christ. Local member NBCA and CBF churches develop stronger ties for the work they embark upon together to the Glory of God."

The general doctrinal perspective of its churches are represented in the NBCA Press, Inc.'s publications, the Southern Baptist's Baptist Faith and Message, and the 1644 and 1689 Baptist Confession of Faith. Churches within the National Baptist Convention of America also adopt a church covenant.

Among the churches of the convention, many pastors and leaders identify as Calvinist or Reformed, or Arminian. The convention has not determined whether Reformed or Arminian teaching are dogma to be upheld by the whole body, in respect to the autonomous nature of Baptist churches. Glossolalia and other Charismatic beliefs vary. National Baptists of the convention observe two ordinances: the Lord's Supper and believer's baptism (also known as credo-baptism, from the Latin for "I believe"). Baptism is considered a prerequisite to church membership.

The National Baptist Convention of America's members denounce same-sex marriage and same-sex unions, and as the NBC USA, they consider homosexuality not a legitimate expression of God's will and are opposed to ordaining active homosexuals or lesbians for any type of ministry in their churches. The National Baptist Convention of America also rejects the ordination of women, though some congregations throughout the United States and Canada have attempted to ordain women as deacons, ministers, and pastors. Its ecumenical partners (the Cooperative Baptist Fellowship and Chicago Theological Seminary of the United Church of Christ) permit women's ordination and affirms LGBT individuals. In response to the theological differences between the Cooperative and National Baptists, NBCA president Dr. Tolbert in 2020 stated, "We get more done realizing we don't have to agree on everything."

See also
Christianity in the United States

External links
National Baptist Convention of America, Inc. - Official website
Profile of the NBCA on the Association of Religion Data Archives website
Jessie M. Bright Collection at Stuart A. Rose Manuscript, Archives, & Rare Book Library, Emory University

References

Historically African-American Christian denominations
Baptist denominations in the United States
Organizations based in Shreveport, Louisiana
Christian organizations established in 1915
Baptist denominations established in the 20th century
Members of the National Council of Churches